Kohali is a village and union council of Jhelum District in the Punjab province of Pakistan. It is part of Sohawa Tehsil, and located at 31°8'0N 72°48'0E with an altitude of 166 metres (547 feet).

References

Populated places in Tehsil Sohawa
Union councils of Sohawa Tehsil